Christopher G. Boone is the dean of the ASU School of Sustainability. President Michael M. Crow appointed him as dean in 2013. Previously he served as associate dean (2010–2013) and was the graduate director when the school was established in 2006. He sits on a two-member directorate for the Julie Ann Wrigley Global Institute of Sustainability, which leads and supports sustainability research, education, and outreach efforts across all 17 colleges at Arizona State University. For the recently established ASU Global Futures Laboratory, he serves on the executive committee.

Boone holds affiliate appointments in the School of Public Affairs, School of Geographical Sciences and Urban Planning, School of Human Evolution & Social Change, and School for the Future of Innovation in Society at Arizona State University. He is a permanent visiting scholar at Leuphana University of Lüneburg, Germany, and a founding board member of the Center for Global Security and Cultural Transformation in Lüneburg, Germany. He serves on the Technical Commission of the US–Mexico Bi-National Laboratory on Climate Change, Adaptation, and Sustainability. For the National Academies of Sciences and Engineering, he serves on a committee to formulate recommendations on sustainability education and curricula at the undergraduate and graduate levels. In 2012–13, he held a visiting professor appointment in the Department of Biology at Georgetown University and served on its Environment Initiative Committee.

Education 

Boone received his Ph.D. in geography from the University of Toronto in 1994 and holds a master's degree from the same institution. In 1987, he received a Bachelor of Arts degree with honours from Queen's University in Kingston, Ontario, Canada. From 1993 to 1995, he was a post-doctoral fellow in the School of Environment at McGill University funded by the Social Sciences and Humanities Research Council of Canada.

Research 
His research expertise focuses on urbanization, sustainability, and environmental justice. He is an investigator for two Long Term Ecological Research Network projects based in Baltimore and Phoenix and funded by the US National Science Foundation. Both projects examine the structure and function of urban ecosystems and how to use that understanding to support sustainability initiatives in cities. He served on the scientific steering committee of the Urbanization and Global Environmental Change Programme, a Future Earth project.  He serves on the Board of Directors and the executive committee of the Academic Sustainability and Environmental Leaders Council for the National Council on Science and the Environment. For the UCLA Sustainable Los Angeles Grand Challenge, he is a member of the Scholarly and Technical Advisory Committee.

He has published in a broad range of journals and has authored two books:
 City and Environment (2006) with Ali Modarres 
 Urbanization and Sustainability: Linking ecology, environmental justice, and global environmental change (2003) with Michail Fragkias

References

External links 
 Central Arizona Phoenix LTER
Baltimore Ecosystem Study LTER

Living people
University of Toronto alumni
American environmentalists
Arizona State University faculty
Year of birth missing (living people)